Hiam or HIAM may refer to

 Hiam (given name)
 Hiam, Ontario, Canada
 Hiam District, Houaphanh Province, Laos
 Hiam, a 1998 novel by Eva Sallis
 Heads of Intelligence Agencies Meeting of the Australian Intelligence Community
 Hoffmann Institute of Advanced Materials, at Shenzhen Polytechnic in Shenzhen, China
 "Hold It Against Me", a 2011 song by Britney Spears